is a Japanese actor and member of EXILE's theater company (Gekidan EXILE). He is currently one of the two Guinness World Record holders for "Most marshmallows caught by mouth in one minute". He rose to fame by acting as a charming and handsome villain in several Japanese TV dramas and movies, such as Roosevelt Game, Water Polo Yankees, Wolf Girl and Black Prince and I love You Just a Little Bit.

Nobuyuki is represented by LDH.

Career 
Nobuyuki Suzuki was born on October 14, 1992, in the Kanagawa Prefecture of Japan, as the youngest of three brothers. He played baseball from the first grade of elementary school to the second grade of junior high school, but had to give up his path of becoming a professional player after breaking his elbow.  

He participated at the VOCAL BATTLE AUDITION 2 held by LDH in February 2010 but failed. He was then scouted by the office and attended EXPG Tokyo School. In August of the same year, he passed the 3rd Gekidan EXILE Audition and started his career as an actor. 

In 2013, he played his first leading role in the movie ARAGURE.

On August 6, 2016, it was announced that Nobuyuki would play the role of Kotaro Amon in the live-action adaptation of the popular manga Tokyo Ghoul, which was released on July 29, 2017.

On February 2, 2018, he released his first photo-book titled FACE.

On January 22, 2019, Nobuyuki and fellow Gekidan Exile member Masayasu Yagi set the Guinness World Record for "Most marshmallows caught with chopsticks in one minute (team of two)" with 43 marshmallows in one minute. However, this record was broken on March 20 by Americans Ashrita Furman and Bipin Larkin with a total number of 46 marshmallows. On February 14, Nobuyuki attended the PRINCE OF LEGEND PREMIUM LIVE SHOW, a fan-meeting with the whole Prince of Legend cast, at Yokohama Arena. During the event he performed a cover of A-ha's "Take On Me" together with Kazuma Kawamura, publicly showcasing his vocal abilities for the first time since his participation in the VOCAL BATTLE AUDITION 2 in 2010. On April 3, Fukuoka Softbank Hawks announced that Nobuyuki would throw the first pitch at the opening ceremony of Takagirl Day in TOKYO (vs. Orix Buffaloes) at Tokyo Dome on the 22nd of the same month. The speed of his pitch reached 122 km/h. Later on June 30, Nobuyuki and Masayasu set yet another Guinness World Record, this time for "Most marshmallows caught by mouth in one minute" with 53 marshmallows in total. On August 26, the stage play "Yusha no Tame ni Kane wa Naru / The Bell Rings for the Brave" was announced for 2020. This would be the first time that all nine members of Gekidan Exile appear in a play and are in charge of its production at the same time. When asked about a challenge he had recently faced during the announcement interview of the play, Nobuyuki revealed he had been studying English for the past 7 months, 4 hours a day, and that he would continue to do so for his own growth. On September 20, Nobuyuki participated as a guest in the Batman 80th Anniversary Shibuya Project Presentation held in Tokyo. There, he expressed his desire to advance to Hollywood at the age of 30 after having studied English intensely for 4 years and becoming fluent in the language. On October 16, 2019, he released a room-wear collection in collaboration with Japanese fashion brand PEACH JOHN. The clothes included are unisex and intended to be shared with your loved one.

On February 19, 2020, Nobuyuki released his second photo-book titled OVERSEAS. The shooting locations for this photo-book were Las Vegas and Los Angeles, symbolizing the actor's approach to his advancement to Hollywood which is his future dream.

Filmography

Films

TV Dramas

Web dramas

Stage

Commercials

Music Videos

Other work

Voice Acting

Photobook

Game

Live

Awards 

 BLOG of the year 2018, received on February 8, 2019

References

External links 

 Gekidan EXILE Official Site

1992 births
Living people
21st-century Japanese male actors
Japanese male film actors
Japanese male television actors
LDH (company) artists